Her Father Said No is a 1927 American comedy film directed by Jack McKeown and written by Al Boasberg. The film stars Mary Brian, Danny O'Shea, Al Cooke, Kit Guard, John Steppling and Frankie Darro. The film was released on January 2, 1927, by Film Booking Offices of America.

Cast
Mary Brian as Charlotte Hamilton
Danny O'Shea as Danny Martin
Al Cooke as Al Conklin
Kit Guard as Kit Goodwin
John Steppling as John Hamilton
Frankie Darro as Matt Doe
Gene Stone as Herbert Penrod
Betty Caldwell as Betty Francis

References

External links
 

1927 films
1920s English-language films
Silent American comedy films
1927 comedy films
Film Booking Offices of America films
American silent feature films
American black-and-white films
1920s American films